Naruse River (鳴瀬川) is a river in Miyagi Prefecture, Japan.

References

Rivers of Miyagi Prefecture
Rivers of Japan